Kaanch Ki Deewar is a 1986 Indian Hindi-language drama film directed by M.N. Yasin and produced by Kamal Chowdhary. It stars Sanjeev Kumar and Smita Patil.

Cast
 Sanjeev Kumar as Jaswant Singh / Durjan Singh
 Smita Patil as Nisha
 Shakti Kapoor as Vikram Singh
 Amrish Puri as Bhoop Singh
 Om Prakash as Durjan's victim
 Jagdeep as Jaswant's Tutor
 Urmila Bhatt as Jaswant's Mother

Music
The music for this film given by the famous duo of Shankar–Jaikishan with lyrics by Kafil Azar.

"Baato Me Na Taalo Ji..." - Mohammed Rafi, Asha Bhosle
"Bichhad Gaye Hai Kahin Na Unka Pata Milega" - Sharda
"Aiyo Na Maro Teer Ka Nishaana" - Sharda, Kishore Kumar
"Ari O Sakhi Bata Toh Sahi Tera Mehboob Kaisa Hai" - Dilraj Kaur, Anuradha Paudwal, Alka Yagnik, Chandrani Mukherjee
"Jalvon Ki Humare" - Anuradha Paudwal, Sharda
"Na Idher Ke Rahe Na Udher Rahe" - Suresh Wadkar, Sharda

References

External links

1980s Hindi-language films
1986 films
Films scored by Shankar–Jaikishan